Mael Fabhaill mac Cleireach (died 887) was the King of Uí Fiachrach Aidhne in Ireland.

Mael Fabhaill was one of the last kings of Aidhne who did not use a surname. His son and successor, Tighearnach Ua Cleirigh, did so and was ancestor to the family of Ó Cléirigh.

Mael Fabhaill had a brother, Eidhean mac Cléireach, who gave his name to the Ó hEidhin family of south County Galway.

References

 Irish Kings and High-Kings, Francis John Byrne (2001), Dublin: Four Courts Press, 
 Annals of Ulster at CELT: Corpus of Electronic Texts at University College Cork

People from County Galway
9th-century Irish monarchs
887 deaths
Year of birth unknown